Temenica is a settlement in the upper valley of the Temenica River in the Municipality of Ivančna Gorica in central Slovenia. The area is part of the historical region of Lower Carniola. The municipality is now included in the Central Slovenia Statistical Region. It includes the hamlets of Osredek, Debeli Hrib, Žabnica, Reber, and Pungrt.

References

External links
Temenica on Geopedia

Populated places in the Municipality of Ivančna Gorica